LB (car ferries) or locally simply LB was a car and lorry ferry line that between 1955 and 1981 operated on the HH Ferry route between Helsingør (Elsinore), Zealand, Denmark and Helsingborg, Scania, Sweden. They were the first operator on this route to challenge the informal monopoly which DSB had enjoyed ever since 1888. Since 1630, competition at the route had only occurred between 1836 and 1840. The route had further been operated by the Danish National railways with train ferries since 1892, and since 1931 with a 50-50 support deal also with the National Swedish railway. Until LB challenged the informal monopoly.

History

Before LB
DSB had taken over from DFDS in 1888, and had from 1892 a solid income in its transportation of trains (passenger train during day time and goods train during the night).
DSB was the single shipping line which were able to transport train across the Øresund, from the Scandinavian peninsula to Denmark. The fact train ferry lines also existed from both Sweden to Germany and Denmark to Germany didn't change this fact. When also the Swedish counterpart to DSB, SJ from 1931 "joined forces" by sharing all expenses and profits equally might, serious competition at the HH route required stronger economical muscles than was available before the time cars became more common. 
Although the official monopoly on the route was abolished by law in 1882, had no challenger on this very short international route dared to defy Danish nationally owned operators DSB before.

Eventually DSB was to be challenged though, as the privately owned shipping cooperation "Johnson Koncernen" (from 1956 by "Stockholms Rederi AB Svea"), both based in Stockholm decided to make an attempt. The privately owned Swedish company AB Linjebuss International, was started as a fully affiliated company, to Johnson in 1954 and to Rederi AB Svea from 1955.

The LB / SL /TL concept 
The new shipping line, Linjebuss International  became at once locally known as LB , was founded in 1954 as a fully affiliate of the "Johnson koncernen" And in the spring of the following year they began to operate, as first challenger on the route for around 120 years. Their first ferry was an old steamer, chartered under the name S/S Betula was built already in 1929. Now "Stockholms Rederi AB Svea" purchased the shipping line, and they had intentions to grow. In 1961 the SL ferries, a Danish shipping line that since 1951 had operated at central Øresund between Copenhagen, Port of Tuborg was purchased and incorporated. And in 1966 Trave Line, a ferry line for lorries mostly which sailed twice every day at the (fairly) long distance  (9-10 hrs) route between Helsingborg or Port of Tuborg and Travemünde, Schleswig-Holstein, (Western- , as of then) Germany, without any getting off service between Helsingborg and Port of Tuborg on southbound tours and vice versa. The entire concept of the three shipping lines soon became LB/SL/TL. And during the 1960s and early 1970s records were beaten annually.

The competition at the HH Ferry route begins 

Back in the mid 1950s, LB sailed the HH route with S/S Betula, a ship build already in 1929. And during summer time also the pure passenger boat M/S Pendula, which was a pedestrian passenger boat only.
From 1960 M/S Primula for 55 cars was taken in use

Primula had unlike DSB's ferries at the time, M/F Helsingør and M/F Hälsingborg which were sister ships, whose cafeterias were located below the train & car decks, and lacked windows, (these two DSB ferries became by time known as "U-boats"), while all Primula and all LB's future ferries had cafeterias as well as restaurants above the car deck. 
 
In 1964, LB put M/S Carola in use, and from the late 1960s could LB provide very good comfort as well as three departures every hour. Their backdraws were the lack of trains (as one single goods train could fill the DSB's ferries during several hours during the night time) and the LB's ferries needed, due to their common design, to turn every time the cars and lorries drove off in the stern. While the DSB vessels instead used a concept of dual commanding bridges, lacking of natural prows, sterns as well as starboard and port-side, they simply sailed in both directions equally well.

LB's three sister ships M/S Betula (II), M/S Regula and M/S Ursula were built and taken into use in 1968, 1971 and 1973. They all took 75 cars, had both cafeterias as well as bars and restaurants  together with the slightly smaller and restaurant-lacking M/S Carola could LB now departure every 20 minutes and had a crossing time of 25 minutes. Also DSB build new and more comfortable ferries, but at least the three sister ships Betula (II), Regula and Ursula had a certain touch of luxury which the DSB ferries not quite managed to provide. Especially the "U-boats" (two of six DSB ferries) gave DSB a little worse reputation. But for 20 or 25 minutes of crossing time, this was hardly of any greater importance.

LB also had a rather poor night time service. Only one of their four ferries were used and pedestrian passengers were unable to go aboard the only ship that sailed between 1:30 and 5:30 am. And the number of cars, lorries and bicycles was very limited if one lorry (or more) carried dangerous goods. The transport of dangerous goods were limited to the night time (also at DSB).

LB challenged 
Perhaps due to the use of the pure passenger ship M/S Pendula, the Norwegian armator Ragnar Moltzau made the HH Ferry route to a full Scandinavian trio route, as he opened the Sundbusserne passenger shipping line, which sailed under Norwegian flag. Sundbusserne means "The Sound Buses" and began to operate in 1958. DSB sailed under Danish flag and LB under Swedish one, so if including "the buses", also the Norwegian flag was represented.

Aftermath of the 1973 Energy Crisis 

After the 1973 energy crisis, as the prices of diesel, oil, and petrol rose to never-before-seen levels, the times got worse. And in 1976 Trave Line was closed. And thereafter the fate of SL ferries was to be decided. Headquarters in Stockholm (who apparently seemed to have a rather low knowledge of the actual Øresund crossing conditions) decided to move the Swedish port of the SL ferries to the larger city Malmö. However this came to the price of a 20 minutes longer crossing time, due to Saltholm island and the very shallow waters around this island. Now the 90 minute  departure schedule (with two ships) couldn't be used.

And the since 1960 established ferry line between Limhamn (a southern borough of Malmö with a harbour of its own) and Dragør (a small town at Amager, separated from Copenhagen by Copenhagen Airport) had a crossing time of just 50 minutes and pedestrian passengers could take the hydrofoil speedboats to Nyhavn in central Copenhagen very fast. For all southbound lorry drives, the move from Landskrona to Malmö also meant half an hour extra driving time. And on top of all that, were the road connections to the central port of Malmö harbour not particularly well adapted to car ferries and especially not to several lorries at the same time. Only nine months after the move, the owners threw in the towel.

Now only LB remained. And in 1981 the merge with the Limhamn-Dragør shipping line became the end of Linjebuss International or LB. Instead Scandinavian Ferry Lines were constructed. They operated for some years in the 1980s on the HH Ferry route as well as on the Limhamn - Dragør route.

References

Transport in Helsingborg
Helsingør
Water transport in Denmark
Water transport in Sweden